Strong–Huttig School District No. 83 is a public school district in Strong, Arkansas. The school district supports more than 350 students and employs more than 50 education and staff.

The school district encompasses  of land in Union County supporting Strong, Huttig, Felsenthal and all the rural area between Moro Bay and the state line.

History
The district begin in 1903. On July 1, 2004, the Strong School District consolidated with the Huttig School District to form the Strong-Huttig School District.

Ordinarily a school district with fewer than 350 students for two consecutive years would be required to consolidate. In 2016 the Arkansas Board of Education granted a waiver that allowed Strong–Huttig to continue operating.

Schools 
 Gardner–Strong Elementary School, serving prekindergarten through grade 6.
 Strong High School, serving grades 7 through 12. Strong athletics are basketball, football, cheerleading, and (girls) softball.

References

Further reading
 These maps include predecessor districts
 2004-2005 School District Map
 Map of Arkansas School Districts pre-July 1, 2004
 (Download)

External links
 
 Strong-Huttig School District No. 83 Union County, Arkansas Regulatory Basis Financial Statements and Other Reports June 30, 2015
 Strong-Huttig School District No. 83 Union County, Arkansas Regulatory Basis Financial Statements And Other Reports June 30, 2016

Education in Union County, Arkansas
School districts in Arkansas
2004 establishments in Arkansas
School districts established in 2004